In category theory, a branch of mathematics, the formal criteria for adjoint functors are criteria for the existence of a left or right adjoint of a given functor.

One criterion is the following, which first appeared in Peter J. Freyd's 1964 book Abelian Categories, an Introduction to the Theory of Functors:

Another criterion is:

References 

Adjoint functors